María del Carmen Izaguirre Francos (born 8 June 1952) is a Mexican politician affiliated with the Institutional Revolutionary Party. As of 2014 she served as Deputy of the LIX Legislature of the Mexican Congress representing Puebla.

References

1952 births
Living people
People from Puebla
Women members of the Chamber of Deputies (Mexico)
Institutional Revolutionary Party politicians
21st-century Mexican politicians
21st-century Mexican women politicians
People from Tehuacán
Deputies of the LIX Legislature of Mexico
Members of the Chamber of Deputies (Mexico) for Puebla
Members of the Senate of the Republic (Mexico) for Puebla
Women members of the Senate of the Republic (Mexico)